AZ-11713908 is a drug developed by AstraZeneca which is a peripherally selective cannabinoid agonist, acting as a potent agonist at the CB1 receptor and a partial agonist at CB2. It has poor blood–brain barrier penetration, and so while it is an effective analgesic in animal tests, it produces only peripheral effects at low doses, with much weaker symptoms of central effects compared to other cannabinoid drugs such as WIN 55,212-2. Many related benzimidazole-derived cannabinoid ligands are known.

See also
 AM-6545
 AZD-1940
 CB-13
 RQ-00202730

References

Cannabinoids
Benzimidazoles
Peripherally selective drugs